WEPS (88.9 FM) is a radio station licensed to serve Elgin, Illinois, United States. The station is owned by the Elgin Area School District U46 and licensed to Board of Education School District U-46.  Founded in 1950, WEPS is the oldest non-commercial educational radio station in the state of Illinois.

WEPS broadcasts a public radio format as a member of Wisconsin Public Radio. WEPS also airs programming from National Public Radio and the BBC World Service.

History
Originally licensed in 1950 to broadcast at 88.1 MHz, WEPS originally broadcast instructional programs to the Elgin Public Schools, local high school sporting events, and was partially staffed by students to give them experience in high school radio station operation. The effort to bring WEPS on the air was led by Ernest C. Waggoner, director of audio-visual education for the school district. The station originally had an ERP of 10 watts. In 1960, the station's frequency was changed to 90.9 MHz, and its ERP was increased to 380 watts. In 1977, the station began sharing time on the frequency with WDCB.

WEPS moved to its current 88.9 MHz frequency in 1987, after reaching an agreement with WDCB, which allowed WDCB to begin full-time operations. The station became an affiliate of Wisconsin Public Radio's Ideas Network on September 28, 2005. During the COVID-19 pandemic throughout 2020 and early 2021, it was effectively a full-time feed of the network due to the closure of U-46 facilities.

2004 license renewal objection by outside party
On July 28, 2004, the Elgin School District filed a routine license renewal request, as required by FCC regulations. On November 1, 2004, a non-profit educational organization with Christian religious ties known as "RB Schools" based in Keene, Texas, filed an application to force WEPS to share time on the 88.9 MHz frequency with a new non-commercial station as part of a larger filing against high school radio stations across the United States. The school district filed a petition to deny this application on April 27, 2005, RB Schools filed its opposition to the petition on May 12, 2005, and the district replied on May 24, 2005. The application was ultimately dismissed and the WEPS license was renewed on May 26, 2005. RB Schools filed a petition for reconsideration on July 1, 2005, and the school district filed its opposition to the petition on July 13, 2005. After due consideration, the petition was granted in part but mostly denied by the FCC on June 29, 2006. RB Schools filed an application for review on August 23, 2006. The district filed its opposition to this application on September 5, 2006, and RB Schools replied on September 15, 2006. The station is currently licensed to the district until December 1, 2028, and all of the RB Schools time-share requests were dismissed by the FCC on September 24, 2008.

References

External links
WEPS U-46 website
WEPS schedule at Wisconsin Public Radio

EPS
High school radio stations in the United States
NPR member stations
Wisconsin Public Radio
Radio stations established in 1950
1950 establishments in Illinois
Elgin, Illinois